Inslaw, Inc. is a Washington, D.C. based information technology company that markets case management software for corporate and government users.

Inslaw is known for developing PROMIS, an early case management software system. It is also known for a lawsuit that it brought against the United States Department of Justice in 1986 over PROMIS. Inslaw won damages in bankruptcy court, but these were overturned on appeal. The suit resulted in several Justice Department internal reviews, two Congressional investigations, the appointment of a special counsel by Attorney General William P. Barr, and a lengthy review of the special counsel's report under Attorney General Janet Reno. Inslaw's claims were finally referred by Congress to the Court of Federal Claims in 1995, and the dispute ended with the Court's ruling against Inslaw in 1998.

During the 12-year long legal proceedings, Inslaw accused the Department of Justice of conspiring to steal its software, attempting to drive it into Chapter 7 liquidation, using the stolen software for covert intelligence operations against foreign governments, and involvement in a murder. These accusations were eventually rejected by the special counsel and the Court of Federal Claims.

History of Inslaw 
Inslaw began as a non-profit organization called the Institute for Law and Social Research. The Institute was founded in 1973 by William A. Hamilton to develop case management software for law enforcement office automation. Funded by grants and contracts from the Law Enforcement Assistance Administration (LEAA), the Institute developed a program it called "PROMIS", an acronym for Prosecutors' Management Information System, for use in law enforcement record keeping and case-monitoring activities. When Congress voted to abolish the LEAA in 1980, Hamilton decided to continue operating as a for-profit corporation and market the software to current and new users. In January 1981 Hamilton established the for-profit Inslaw, transferring the Institute's assets over to the new corporation.

Development of Promis 
PROMIS software was originally written in COBOL for use on mainframe computers; later a version was developed to run on 16 bit mini-computers such as the Digital Equipment Corporation PDP-11. The primary users of this early version of the software were the United States Attorneys Office of the District of Columbia, and state and local law enforcement. Both the mainframe and 16 bit mini-computer versions of PROMIS were developed under LEAA contracts, and in later litigation, both Inslaw and DOJ eventually agreed that the early version of PROMIS was in the public domain, meaning that neither the Institute nor its successor had exclusive rights to it.

The Promis implementation contract 
In 1979, the DOJ contracted with the Institute to do a pilot project that installed versions of PROMIS in four US Attorneys offices; two using the mini-computer version, and the other two a "word-processor" version which the Institute was developing. Encouraged by the results, the Department decided in 1981 to go ahead with a full implementation of locally based PROMIS systems, and issued a request for proposals (RFP) to install the mini-computer version of PROMIS in the 20 largest United States Attorneys offices. This contract, usually called the "implementation contract" in later litigation, also included developing and installing "word-processor" versions of PROMIS at 74 smaller offices. The now for-profit Inslaw responded to the RFP, and in March 1982 was awarded the three year $10m contract by the contracting division, the Executive Office of United States Attorneys (EOUSA).

Contract disputes and Inslaw bankruptcy
The contract did not go smoothly. Disputes between EOUSA and Inslaw began soon after its execution. A key dispute over proprietary rights had to be solved by a bi-lateral change to the original contract. (This change, "Modification 12," is discussed below.) EOUSA also determined that Inslaw was in violation of the terms of an "advance payment" clause in the contract. This clause was important to Inslaw's financing and became the subject of months of negotiations. There were also disputes over service fees. During the first year of the contract, the DOJ did not have the hardware to run PROMIS in any of the offices covered by the contract. As a stopgap measure, Inslaw provided PROMIS on a time-share basis through a VAX computer in Virginia, allowing the offices to access PROMIS on the Inslaw VAX through remote terminals, until the needed equipment was installed on-site. EOUSA claimed that Inslaw had overcharged for this service and withheld payments.

The DOJ ultimately acquired Prime computers, and Inslaw began installing PROMIS on these in the second year of the contract, in August 1983. The "word-processor" PROMIS installation, however, continued to have problems, and in February 1984 the DOJ cancelled this portion of the contract. Following this cancellation, the financial condition of Inslaw worsened, and the company filed for Chapter 11 bankruptcy in February 1985.

Proprietary rights dispute
The implementation contract called for the installation of the mini-computer version of PROMIS, plus some later modifications that had also been funded by LEAA contracts and like the mini-computer version were in the public domain. In addition, the contract data rights clause "gave the government unlimited rights in any technical data and computer software delivered under the contract." This presented a potential conflict with Inslaw's plans to market a commercial version of PROMIS which it called "PROMIS 82" or "Enhanced PROMIS." The issue came up early in the implementation contract, but was resolved by an exchange of letters in which DOJ signed off on the issue after Inslaw assured the DOJ that PROMIS 82 contained "enhancements undertaken by Inslaw at private expense after the cessation of LEAA funding."

The issue arose again in December 1982 when the DOJ invoked its contract rights to request all the PROMIS programs and documentation being provided under the contract. The reason the DOJ gave for this request in later litigation was that it was concerned about Inslaw's financial condition. At that point, DOJ had access to PROMIS only through the VAX time-sharing arrangement with Inslaw; if Inslaw failed, DOJ would be left without a copy of the software and data it was entitled to under the contract. Inslaw responded in February 1983 that it was willing to provide the computer tapes and documents for PROMIS, but that the tapes it had were for the VAX version of PROMIS, and included proprietary enhancements. Before providing the tapes, Inslaw wrote, "Inslaw and the Department of Justice will have to reach an agreement on the inclusion or exclusion" of the features.

The DOJ response to Inslaw was to emphasize that the implementation contract called for a version of PROMIS in which the government had unlimited rights and to ask for information about the enhancements Inslaw claimed as proprietary. Inslaw agreed to provide this information, but noted that it would be difficult to remove the enhancements from the time-sharing version of PROMIS and offered to provide the VAX version of PROMIS if the DOJ would agree to limit their distribution. In March 1983, the DOJ again informed Inslaw that the implementation contract required Inslaw to produce software in which the government had unlimited rights, and that delivery of software with restrictions would not satisfy the contract.

Contract revisions
After some back and forth, DOJ contracting officer Peter Videnieks sent a letter proposing a contract modification. Under the modification, in return for the software and data request, DOJ agreed not to disclose or disseminate the material "beyond the Executive Office for United States Attorney and the 94 United States Attorneys' Offices covered by the subject contract, until the data rights of the parties to the contract are resolved." To resolve the data rights issue, the letter proposed that Inslaw identify its claimed proprietary enhancements and demonstrate that the enhancements were developed "at private expense and outside the scope of any government contract." After these were identified, the government would then "either direct Inslaw to delete those enhancements from the versions of PROMIS to be delivered under the contract or negotiate with Inslaw regarding the inclusion of those enhancements in that software." Inslaw eventually agreed to this suggestion, and the change, referred to as "Modification 12," was executed in April 1983. Inslaw then provided DOJ with tapes and documentation for the VAX version of PROMIS.

Under this arrangement, however, Inslaw had substantial difficulty demonstrating the extent of the enhancements and the use of private funding in their development. It proposed several methods for doing this, but these were rejected by DOJ as inadequate. Inslaw's attempts to identify the proprietary enhancements and their funding ended when it began installing PROMIS on the USAO Prime computers in August 1983. By the end of the contract in March 1983, it had completed installing PROMIS in all 20 of the offices specified in the implementation contract. Since none of the available versions of PROMIS was compatible with the Department's new Prime computers, Inslaw ported the VAX version, which contained Inslaw's claimed enhancements, to the Prime computers.

Inslaw's bankruptcy case
After Inslaw filed for Chapter 11 bankruptcy in February 1985, there were still disputes over implementation contract payments, and as a result the DOJ was listed as one of Inslaw's creditors.  At the same time, the DOJ continued its office automation program and, in place of the originally planned "word-processor" version of PROMIS, it installed the version ported to Prime mini-computers in at least 23 more offices. When Inslaw learned of the installations, it notified EOUSA that this was in violation of Modification 12 and filed a claim for $2.9m, which Inslaw said was the license fees for the software DOJ self-installed. Inslaw also filed claims for services performed during the contract, for a total of $4.1m. The DOJ contracting officer, Peter Videnieks, denied all these claims.

Inslaw appealed the denial of the service fees to the Department of Transportation Board of Contract Appeals (DOTBCA).  For the data rights claim, however, Inslaw took a different approach. In June 1986 it filed an adversary hearing in the Bankruptcy Court, claiming that DOJ's actions violated the automatic stay provision of the bankruptcy code by interfering with the company's rights to its software.

Inslaw's initial filing claimed that the contract disputes arose because the DOJ officials who administered the contract were biased against Inslaw. The filing specifically mentioned PROMIS project manager, C. Madison Brewer, and Associate Attorney General, D. Lowell Jensen. Brewer had previously been Inslaw's general counsel, but according to Inslaw had been terminated for cause. Inslaw claimed that Brewer's dismissal caused him to be unreasonably biased against Inslaw and owner William Hamilton. Jensen was a member of the project oversight committee at the time of the contract. He had helped to develop another competing case management software system several years earlier, and Inslaw claimed that this led him to be prejudiced against PROMIS, so that he ignored the unreasonable bias of Brewer.

"Independent handling" proceeding
In February 1987, Inslaw requested an "independent handling hearing", to force the DOJ to conduct the adversary hearing "independent of any Department of Justice officials involved in the allegations made" in the hearing. The bankruptcy court judge assigned to handle Inslaw's Chapter 11 proceedings, Judge George F. Bason, granted the request, and scheduled the hearing for June.

Prior to the hearing, Inslaw owners William and Nancy Hamilton spoke to Anthony Pasciuto, then the Deputy Director of the Executive Office of the United States Trustees (EOUST), a DOJ component responsible for overseeing the administration of bankruptcy cases. Pasciuto told the Hamiltons that the Director of the EOUST, Thomas Stanton, had pressured the U.S. Trustee assigned to the Inslaw case, Edward White, to convert Inslaw's bankruptcy from chapter 11 (reorganization of the company), to chapter 7 (liquidation). The Hamiltons had Inslaw's attorneys depose the people whom Pasciuto had named. One of them corroborated part of Pasciuto's claims: Cornelius Blackshear, then a U. S. Trustee in New York, swore in his deposition testimony that he was aware of pressure to convert the bankruptcy. Two days later, however, Blackshear submitted an affidavit recanting his testimony, saying that he had mistakenly recalled an instance of pressure from another case.

Blackshear repeated his retraction at the June hearing on Inslaw's request. Pasciuto also retracted part of his claims at this hearing, and said instead that he did not use the word "conversion." Judge Bason, however, chose to believe the original depositions of Pasciuto and Blackshear, and found that the DOJ, "unlawfully, intentionally and willfully" tried to convert INSLAW's Chapter 11 reorganization case to a Chapter 7 liquidation "without justification and by improper means." In the ruling, Bason was harshly critical of the testimony of several DOJ officials, describing it as "evasive and unbelievable," or "simply on its face unbelievable." He enjoined the DOJ and the EOUST from contacting anyone in the U.S. Trustee's office handling the Inslaw case except for information requests.

Adversary proceeding
Inslaw's adversary proceeding followed a month after the "independent handling hearing." The proceeding lasted for two and half weeks, from late July to August. In a bench ruling on September 28, Judge Bason found that DOJ project manager Brewer, "believing he had been wrongfully discharged by Mr. Hamilton and INSLAW, developed an intense and abiding hatred for Mr. Hamilton and INSLAW," and had used his position at DOJ to "vent his spleen." He also found that the DOJ "took, converted, stole, INSLAW's enhanced PROMIS by trickery, fraud, and deceit." Specifically, he found that DOJ had used the threat of terminating "advance payments" to get a copy of the enhanced PROMIS that it was not entitled to, and that it had negotiated modification 12 of the contract in bad faith, never intending to meet its commitment under the modification. In his ruling, Judge Bason again called the testimony of DOJ witnesses "biased", "unbelievable", and "unreliable."

Judge Bason not reappointed
Bankruptcy Court Judge Bason was appointed to the District of Columbia Bankruptcy Court in February 1984 for a four-year term. He sought re-appointment early in 1987, but was informed in December that the Court of Appeals had chosen another candidate. Judge Bason then suggested in a letter to the Court of Appeals that DOJ might have improperly influenced the selection process because of his bench ruling for Inslaw. After learning of this letter, DOJ lawyers moved to recuse Judge Bason from the Inslaw case, but their motion was rejected, and Judge Bason remained on the case until the expiration of his term on February 8, 1988. In early February, Judge Bason filed a lawsuit seeking to prevent the judge the Court of Appeals had selected for the District of Columbia Bankruptcy Court from taking office, but the suit was rejected.  Bason's last actions in the case were to file a written ruling on Inslaw's adversary proceeding, and to award damages and attorneys fees to Inslaw.

Appeals of the bankruptcy suit
After Judge Bason left the bench, the Inslaw bankruptcy was assigned to Baltimore bankruptcy judge James Schneider. Schneider accepted Inslaw's reorganization plan at the end of 1988 after a cash infusion from IBM. In the meanwhile, DOJ filed an appeal of Judge Bason's adversary suit ruling in the District of Columbia Circuit Court. In November 1989, Circuit Court Judge William Bryant upheld Bason's ruling. Reviewing the case under the "clear error" standard for reversal, Bryant wrote: "[T]here is convincing, perhaps compelling support for the findings set forth by the bankruptcy court."

DOJ appealed the Circuit Court decision and in May 1991, the Court of Appeals found the DOJ had not violated the automatic stay provisions of the bankruptcy code and that the Bankruptcy Court therefore lacked jurisdiction over Inslaw's claims against DOJ. It vacated the Bankruptcy Court's rulings and dismissed Inslaw's complaint. Inslaw appealed the decision to the Supreme Court, which declined to hear the case.

Federal investigations
Inslaw's allegations against the Justice Department led to a number of investigations, including internal Department probes and Congressional investigations by the Senate's Permanent Subcommittee on Investigations (PSI) and the House Judiciary Committee. The DOJ eventually appointed a special counsel to investigate. After the special counsel issued his report, Inslaw responded with a lengthy rebuttal. The DOJ then re-examined the special counsel's findings, resulting in the release of a final Department review.

During these federal investigations, Inslaw began making allegations of a broad, complex conspiracy to steal PROMIS, involving many more people and many more claims than the bankruptcy proceedings had covered. These later allegations are described below under the investigations which examined them.

Justice Department investigations
After Judge Bason's June 1987 bench ruling found several DOJ officials' testimony "unbelievable", DOJ's Office of Professional Responsibility (OPR) opened an investigation of DOJ staff who testified at the hearing, including C. Madison Brewer, Peter Videnieks, and EOUST director Thomas Stanton. It also opened a separate investigation of EOUST deputy director Anthony Pasciuto.  OPR recommended Pasciuto be terminated, based on his hearing testimony that he had made false statements to the Hamiltons, but in its final report it found no evidence that the other officials investigated had applied pressure to convert Inslaw's bankruptcy or lied during the independent handling hearing. After Judge Bason issued his written ruling in January 1988, Inslaw's attorneys also complained to the DOJ's Public Integrity Section that Judge Blackshear and U.S. Trustee Edward White had committed perjury. Public Integrity opened an investigation that ultimately found perjury cases could not be proven, and recommended declining prosecution.

The Senate report
The first Congressional investigation into the Inslaw case came from the Senate's Permanent Subcommittee on Investigations (PSI). PSI's report was issued in September 1989, after a year and a half of investigation. During the investigation, Inslaw made a number of new allegations, which take up most of the PSI report.

New allegations
Inslaw's new allegations described the Justice Department dispute with Inslaw as part of a broad conspiracy to drive Inslaw into bankruptcy so that Earl Brian, the founder of a venture capital firm called Biotech (later Infotechnology), could acquire Inslaw's assets, including its software PROMIS. Inslaw owner William Hamilton told PSI investigators that Brian had first attempted to acquire Inslaw through a computer services corporation he controlled, called Hadron. Hamilton said that he rejected an offer from Hadron to acquire Inslaw, and that Brian then attempted to drive Inslaw into bankruptcy through his influence with Attorney General Edwin Meese.

Both Meese and Brian had served in the cabinet of Ronald Reagan when he was governor of California, and Meese's wife had later bought stock in Brian's company, so that Meese was willing to do this, Hamilton claimed. The contract dispute with DOJ was contrived by Brian and Meese with the help of Associate Attorney General Jensen, and PROMIS project manager Brewer.

Hamilton also complained that a DOJ automation program, 'Project Eagle', was part of a scheme to benefit Brian after he acquired PROMIS, and that an AT&T subsidiary, AT&T Information Systems, had engaged with the DOJ in a conspiracy to interfere with Inslaw's efforts to reorganize. He also told PSI investigators that the DOJ had undermined Bankruptcy Court Judge Bason's reappointment, and had attempted to undermine Inslaw's lead counsel in the bankruptcy suit.

Report findings
Senate investigators found no proof for any of these claims. Their report noted that the bankruptcy court ruling had not concluded that Jensen had engaged in a conspiracy against Inslaw and that their own investigation had found no proof that Jensen and Meese had conspired to ruin Inslaw or steal its product, or that Brian or Hadron were involved in a conspiracy to undermine Inslaw and acquire its assets.

The report did re-examine the bankruptcy finding that the DOJ had pressured the United States Trustee to recommend converting Inslaw's bankruptcy from Chapter 11 to Chapter 7, and found that EOUST director Thomas Stanton had improperly tried to get special handling for Inslaw's bankruptcy. He did this, the report stated, in order to gain support for the EOUST from the DOJ.

The report concluded that the Subcommittee found no proof for a broad conspiracy against Inslaw within the DOJ, or a conspiracy between DOJ officials and outside parties to force Inslaw into bankruptcy for personal benefit. However, it criticized DOJ for hiring a former Inslaw employee (Brewer) to oversee Inslaw's contract with EOUSA, and for failing to follow standard procedures in handling Inslaw's complaints.  It also criticized the DOJ for a lack of cooperation with the Subcommittee, which delayed the investigation and undercut the Subcommittee's ability to interview Department employees.

The House report
Following the PSI report, the House Judiciary Committee began another investigation into the dispute. By the time the report was released in September 1992, Inslaw's bankruptcy suit had been first upheld in the D.C. Circuit Court, then vacated by the D.C. Appeals court. The House report thus took a different approach to several of the legal issues that the Senate report had discussed. Like the Senate report, much of the House report dealt with new evidence and new allegations from Inslaw.

New allegations
Inslaw's new evidence consisted of statements and affidavits from witnesses supporting Inslaw's previous claims. The most important of these witnesses was Michael Riconosciuto, who swore in an affidavit for Inslaw that businessman Earl Brian had provided him with a copy of Inslaw's enhanced Promis, supporting Inslaw's earlier claims that Brian had been interested in acquiring and marketing the software. A new allegation was also introduced in Riconosciuto's affidavit: Riconosciuto swore that he added modifications to enhanced PROMIS "to support a plan for the implementation of PROMIS in law enforcement and intelligence agencies worldwide." According to Riconosciuto, "Earl W. Brian was spearheading the plan for this worldwide use of the PROMIS computer software."

Another important witness was Ari Ben-Menashe, who also provided affidavits for Inslaw that Brian had brought both public domain and enhanced versions of PROMIS to Israel, and eventually sold the enhanced version to the Israeli government. Committee investigators interviewed Ben-Menashe in May 1991, and he told them that Brian sold enhanced PROMIS to both Israeli intelligence and Singapore's armed forces, receiving several million dollars in payment. He also testified that Brian sold public domain versions to Iraq and Jordan.

Report findings
On the issue of Inslaw's rights in "enhanced PROMIS", the House report found that "There appears to be strong evidence" supporting Judge Bason's finding that DOJ "acted willfully and fraudulently" when it "took, converted and stole" INSLAW's Enhanced PROMIS by "trickery, fraud and deceit."

Like Judge Bason, the report found that DOJ did not negotiate with Inslaw in good faith, citing a statement by Deputy Attorney General Arnold Burns as "one of the most damaging statements received by the committee." According to the report, Burns told OPR investigators that Department attorneys informed him in 1986 that INSLAW's claim of proprietary rights was legitimate and that DOJ would probably lose in court on this issue. House Investigator found it "incredible" that DOJ would pursue litigation after such a determination, and concluded "This clearly raises the specter that the Department actions taken against INSLAW in this matter represent an abuse of power of shameful proportions."

On the new allegations brought by Inslaw, although the Committee conducted extensive investigations, the report did not make any factual findings on the allegations, it did conclude that further investigation was warranted into the statements and claims of Inslaw's witnesses.

The report also discussed the case of Danny Casolaro, a free-lance writer who became interested in the Inslaw case in 1990, and began his own investigation. According to statements from Casolaro's friends  and family, the scope of his investigation eventually expanded to include a number of scandals of the time, including the Iran-Contra affair, the October Surprise conspiracy claims, and the BCCI banking scandal. In August 1991, Casolaro was found dead in a hotel room where he was staying. The initial coroner's report ruled his death suicide, but Casolaro's family and friends were suspicious, and a lengthy second autopsy was conducted. This too ruled Casolaro's death a suicide, but House investigators noted that "The suspicious circumstances surrounding his death have led some law enforcement professionals and others to believe that his death may not have been a suicide," and strongly urged further investigation.

The Democratic majority  called upon Attorney General Dick Thornburgh to compensate Inslaw immediately for the harm that the government had "egregiously" inflicted on Inslaw. The Republican minority dissented and the committee divided along party lines 21–13.

Bua report
In October 1991 William P. Barr succeeded Dick Thornburgh as Attorney General. In November, Barr appointed retired federal judge Nicholas J. Bua as a Special Counsel to investigate the allegations in the Inslaw case. Bua was granted authority to appoint his own staff and investigators, to impanel a grand jury, and to issue subpoenas. In March 1993 he issued a 267-page report.

The report concluded that there was no credible evidence to support Inslaw's allegations that DOJ officials conspired to help Earl Brian acquire PROMIS software, and that the evidence was overwhelming that there was no connection between Brian and PROMIS. It found the evidence "woefully insufficient" to support the claim that DOJ obtained enhanced PROMIS through "fraud, trickery, and deceit," or that DOJ illegally distributed PROMIS inside or outside of DOJ. It found no credible evidence that DOJ had influenced the selection process that replaced Judge Bason. It found "insufficient evidence" to confirm the allegation that DOJ employees sought to influence the conversion of Inslaw's bankruptcy or commit perjury to conceal the attempt to do so. Finally, it concluded that the DOJ had not sought to influence the investigation of Danny Casolaro's death, and that the physical evidence strongly supported the autopsy finding of suicide.

Bua's report came to a number of conclusions that contradicted earlier proceedings and investigations. Judge Bason had found that DOJ's claim it was concerned about Inslaw's financial condition when it requested a copy of PROMIS was a false pretext. Bua rejected this finding as "just plain wrong." The House report had cited Deputy Attorney General Burns' statements as evidence that DOJ knew it did not have a valid defense to Inslaw's claims. Bua found this interpretation "entirely unwarranted."

Bua was particularly critical of several of Inslaw's witnesses. He found that Michael Riconosciuto had given inconsistent accounts in statements to the Hamiltons, his affidavit, and in testimony at his 1992 trial for manufacturing methamphetamine. Bua compared Riconosciuto's story about PROMIS to "a historical novel; a tale of total fiction woven against the background of accurate historical facts."

Bua found Ari Ben-Menashe's affidavits for Inslaw inconsistent with his later statements to Bua, in which Ben-Menashe said that he had "no knowledge of the transfer of Inslaw's proprietary software by Earl Brian or DOJ" and denied that he had ever said this elsewhere. Ben-Menashe said that others simply assumed that he was referring in his previous statements to Inslaw's PROMIS, but acknowledged that one reason he failed to clarify this was because he was going to publish a book and "he wanted to make sure that his affidavit was filed in court and came to the attention of the public."

Bua also noted that the House October Surprise Task Force had examined Ben-Menashe's October Surprise allegations and found them "totally lacking in credibility," "demonstrably false from beginning to end," "riddled with inconsistencies and factual misstatements," and "a total fabrication." He specifically observed that the Task Force found no evidence to substantiate Ben-Menashe's October Surprise allegations about Earl Brian.

DOJ review
Inslaw responded to the Bua report with a 130-page Rebuttal, and another set of new allegations in an Addendum. These allegations included the claim that the DOJ's Office of Special Investigations was "a front for the Justice Department's own covert intelligence service" and that "another undeclared mission of the Justice Department's covert agents was to insure that investigative journalist Danny Casolaro remained silent about the role of the Justice Department in the INSLAW scandal by murdering him in west Virginia in August 1991."

By this time, Janet Reno had succeeded Barr as Attorney General after Bill Clinton's election as president. Reno then asked for a review of Bua's report with recommendations on appropriate actions. In September 1994, the Department released a 187-page review (written by Assistant Associate Attorney General John C. Dwyer) which concluded that "there is no credible evidence that Department officials conspired to steal computer software developed by Inslaw, Inc. or that the company is entitled to additional government payments." The review also reaffirmed the earlier police findings that Casolaro's death was a suicide and rejected Inslaw's claim that OSI agents had murdered Casolaro as "fantasy," with "no corroborative evidence that is even marginally credible."

Court of Federal Claims trial and ruling
In May 1995, the United States Senate asked the U.S. Court of Federal Claims to determine if the United States owed Inslaw compensation for the government's use of PROMIS. On July 31, 1997, Judge Christine Miller, the hearing officer for the U.S. Court of Federal Claims ruled that all of the versions of PROMIS were in the public domain and that the government had therefore always been free to do whatever it wished with PROMIS. The following year, the appellate authority, a three-judge Review Panel of the same court, upheld Miller's ruling and in August 1998 informed the Senate of its findings.

Deaths allegedly related to Inslaw
In general, the Inslaw court cases generated a great deal of media attention at the time due to the peculiar circumstances and implications surrounding it. Furthermore, one of the most contentious and controversial aspects involving the case was the number of unsolved or suspicious deaths of people allegedly associated with both Inslaw and the PROMIS software. In total, over at least forty people who were apparently linked to the case have been variously identified in media reports to having died mysterious or suspicious deaths. The following are some of the various deaths, suicides and murders that have been postulated in the media to having been tentatively related to a possible greater conspiracy involving Inslaw:
 On March 22, 1977, escrow agent Charles Morgan left his Tucson, Arizona home to take both of his daughters to school and after dropping them off, he disappeared. Three days later, he returned home and according to his wife, Ruth, he was missing a shoe, had a plastic handcuff around one ankle, and his hands were tied together with a plastic zip tie. He was unable to speak, but he wrote down that he had been kidnapped and tortured. He also wrote that a hallucinogenic drug had been painted on his throat which would drive him insane or kill him if he ingested it. Ruth nursed Charles back to health over the course of one week since he was too afraid to leave the house. Charles claimed that he had worked as an agent for the federal government and he fought against organised crime. He also claimed that "they" had taken his treasury identification and that he escaped from his captors near Phoenix's Sky Harbor Airport. After his kidnapping, Charles began wearing a bulletproof vest and even grew a beard to further mask his identity. He also resumed driving his daughters to and from school and he also informed the school that nobody else should be allowed to pick them up. On June 7, two months after his initial disappearance, Charles disappeared again. Nine days later, an unidentified woman called Ruth and said: "Chuck is alright, Ecclesiastics 12: 1-8". This is a reference to a Bible passage, which reads, in part: "Men are afraid of a high place and of terrors on the road. Remember him before the silver cord is broken and the golden bowl is crushed. Then the dust will return to the earth as it was and the spirit will return to God who gave it." Two days later, Charles was found in the desert thirty feet off the highway in the San Juan Springs area. He had been shot once in the back of the head with a bullet from his .357 Magnum, which was beside him but no fingerprints were found on it. Gunshot residue was found on his left hand, indicating he had fired the weapon. In his car, police found a note that had directions to the crime scene written in his handwriting. Also found in the car were several weapons, ammunition, a CB radio and one of his teeth which was wrapped in a white handkerchief in the back seat. A pair of sunglasses was also found that did not belong to him. Also, Charles had clipped a $2 bill inside his underwear. Written on the bill were seven Spanish names from the letters A to G. Ecclesiastics 12 was written, with the verses 1 through 8 marked by arrows drawn on the bill's serial number. This was the same reference that the female caller had made to Ruth. On the back of the bill, the signers of the Declaration of Independence were numbered 1 through 7 and a crude map was also drawn, which showed several roads between Tucson and the Mexican border. The towns Robles Junction and Sasabe were marked. Two days after his death, an anonymous woman spoke to an officer for the Pima County Sheriff's Department on the telephone. She claimed that Charles was supposed to have met her at a local motel shortly before he died. She claimed that her nickname was "Green Eyes" and that she was the same woman who had called Ruth several days earlier. She also claimed that at the motel, Charles showed her a briefcase containing several thousand dollars in cash and he said that the money would buy him out of a gang contract that had been put on his life. Authorities ultimately ruled that Charles committed suicide since they believed that he did so either because of financial difficulties or fears for his safety. His family and an Unsolved Mysteries reporter named Don Deveraux believed he was murdered and some investigators also suspected that his death was not a suicide. Shortly after Charles' death, his impounded car was broken into while it was in police possession and around that same time, his office was also ransacked. Three weeks after his death, two men claiming to be FBI agents arrived at the Morgan home and ransacked it as well. When Deveraux contacted the FBI, they claimed that they had never even heard of Morgan. Morgan's case was profiled on an Unsolved Mysteries episode which aired on February 7, 1990. Deveraux investigated several leads that came up as a result of the program and he discovered that Morgan was heavily involved in money laundering activities through his Tucson escrow company and that from 1973 to 1977, he was involved in large gold and platinum transactions. He received a considerable amount of money from these activities, and some of this money allegedly came from Southeast Asia. Deveraux also discovered that Morgan kept duplicate records of these illicit transactions which led him to believe that Morgan was killed because he still had these records. In 1991, Deveraux was contacted by journalist Danny Casolaro and he agreed to share with him the information that he had uncovered about Morgan's illegal gold transactions. However, Casolaro died suspiciously before he received the information.
 On June 30, 1981, Ralph Boger, 42, Fred Alvarez, 32, vice-chairman of the Cabazon Indian Tribal Council, and Patricia Castro, 44, were executed in the back patio of Alvarez's rented home on Bob Hope Drive in Rancho Mirage, California. The three victims each were shot with a single .38 caliber bullet to the head, according to an autopsy report. There were no visible signs of a struggle. Their bodies were discovered on July 1 by former tribal chairman Joe Benitez and Cabazon member William Callaway. The two male victims, along with Benitez and Callaway, were scheduled to meet at 10 a.m. on July 1 with Steve Rios, an attorney in San Juan Capistrano, to initiate an investigation of Cabazon tribal affairs. Victims Alvarez and Boger had previously divulged their findings to local media outlets that they were marked for death, but their story never got published. However, the subsequent killings of Alvarez, Boger and Castro were reported. William Cole, a Los Angeles-based attorney, was hired to investigate possible links between the triple slayings and the Cabazon Casino. Cole noted to local reporters that sheriff's deputies had confiscated papers from the Alvarez home and that he expected officials to turn those over to his office. Detective Gordon Hunter responded to Cole's allegations by saying that the sheriff's department was investigating leads into the Alvarez slayings, but that he had no knowledge of whether deputies had confiscated any of Alvarez's papers. Alvarez's mother, Phyllis, told the authorities that she believed the murders were the result of a Mafia contract. She also said her son was killed because he was trying to get the Cabazon Casino shut down. Alvarez had become outspoken regarding corruption and United States government ties to the Cabazon tribe. He and Boger were also scheduled to meet with an unknown party to present proof of many of the alleged misuses of tribal land however their murders took place before this meeting. Allegedly, they had information regarding illegal arms deals, weapons manufacturing and testing, and illegal modifications made to the PROMIS software, all taking place on tribal land. The daughter of Ralph Boger, Rachel Begley, has claimed that a number of bizarre circumstances surrounded her father's murder: the police never notified her family of the murders; the family learned from watching the local news; moreover, authorities refused to show the family Boger's body, and allegedly had him cremated without consent; lastly, the house in which the murders occurred was bulldozed within two days, and mysterious "guys in black suits" were said to have appeared at his funeral. In October 2009, an ex-Army Ranger and former security director at the Cabazon casino and the tribe’s bingo operations, James Hughes, was charged with murder and conspiracy relating to the unsolved triple murder. However, the California state attorney general’s office dropped all of the charges against Hughes and he was subsequently released from prison. One of the reasons for Hughes' indictment was that Begley had actually tracked Hughes for two years and, with Alvarez’s son, confronted him at a 2008 religious conference in Fresno and secretly filmed their conversation. “Your parents got killed in a Mafia hit. That’s life. That’s what happened,” Hughes was taped as saying. According to sworn affidavits by Michael Riconosciuto, the PROMIS software had been modified by him on the Cabazon Indian Reservation, where he worked as part of a Wackenhut Corporation project.
 On January 14, 1982, 32-year-old Paul Morasca was found murdered and badly decomposed in a San Francisco condominium by his roommate Michael Riconosciuto. He had been found hog-tied next to his computer, from which a hard drive disk had been ripped out. According to authorities, Morasca was a "money launderer for the Gambino family" who was "asphyxiated after being bound with wire in a technique used by the Japanese ‘Yakuza.’"
 At 11 p.m. on May 14, 1990, 35-year-old Doug Johnston left for his night shift at a computer graphics company. An hour later, he was found shot to death in his car in the company parking lot. He had been shot behind his left ear from a distance of at least twelve inches. At first, authorities believed that his death was a suicide. However, he was right-handed, there was no powder residue on his hands, and there was no gun found at the scene. Authorities have not been able to determine Doug's death was either a suicide or a homicide. Doug had a similar house and drove a similar car to journalist Don Devereux, who lived across the street from the parking lot where Doug was killed. Devereux was investigating the murder of Charles Morgan at the time. Six months after the death of Danny Casolaro, Devereux learned from another journalist that there was purportedly a hit placed on him, but that Doug was mistakenly killed as a result. A CIA official and an informant for Israeli Intelligence confirmed the death threats to him. Devereux stated in the March 10, 1993, Unsolved Mysteries episode which profiled Casolaro's case that he was certain that Doug was mistakenly killed as a result of a botched assassination that was meant for him. Doug's suspected murder remains unsolved.
 Alan David Standorf, 34, was a former civilian employee of Vint Hill Farms Station, working on National Security Agency (NSA) Signals intelligence. Standorf was found dead at a Washington, D.C. Metropolitan Washington Airport car park wedged into the floor of the backseat of his car on January 3, 1991. Standorf's cause of death was ruled as "blunt force trauma to the back of the head". Standorf was alleged to have leaked classified documents relating to the PROMIS intelligence software to investigative journalist Danny Casolaro.
 On April 23, 1991, 50-year-old Dennis Eisman, a Philadelphia attorney for Michael Riconosciuto, was found dead while sitting in his parked car, killed by a single bullet in his chest.  According to a former federal official who worked with Eisman, the attorney was found dead in a downtown parking garage where he had been due to meet with a woman who had crucial evidence to share substantiating Riconosciuto's claims regarding Inslaw. Authorities ultimately ruled that Eisman committed suicide amid reports that he was about to be indicted.
 In July 1991, Anson Ng Yong, 43, a British reporter for the Financial Times was found shot to death in his apartment bathtub in Guatemala. Ng had reportedly went to Guatemala to interview a key witness, James Hughes, a one-time director of security for the Cabazon Indian Reservation secret projects that was alleged to have important information tying the United States Justice Department to the Bank of Credit and Commerce International (BCCI) scandal. According to an official statement by California United States Senator Alan Cranston, Ng “may have been killed because he was investigating the scandal-ridden Bank of Credit and Commerce International.” Specifically, “Ng’s murder was related to his probe into arms trafficking allegedly carried out by BCCI.” In a statement released at a Senate Foreign Relations subcommittee hearing, he said: "Although officials in Guatemala have sought to characterize Ng's assassination as the work of common criminals, the murder seems to be the work of professional hitmen". Ng’s murder was also noted to have resembled the death of Danny Casolaro, another journalist who was investigating the BCCI. Both were found dead in their bathtub and both are believed to have had sensitive documents that were never found.
 At 12:30 p.m on August 10, 1991, 44-year-old investigative reporter Danny Casolaro was found dead in his hotel room near Martinsburg, West Virginia. A maid had found him in his bathtub and both of his wrists had been slashed several times. Under Casolaro's body, paramedics found an empty Milwaukee beer can, two white plastic liner-trash bags, and a single edge razor blade. There was also a half-empty wine bottle nearby. Nothing was placed in the bathtub drain to prevent debris from draining away, and none of the bathwater was saved. Other than the gruesome scene, the hotel room was clean and orderly. There was a legal pad and a pen present on the desk; a single page had been torn from the pad, and a message written on it: "To those who I love the most: Please forgive me for the worst possible thing I could have done. Most of all I'm sorry to my son. I know deep down inside that God will let me in." Based on the note, the absence of a struggle, no sign of a forced entry, and the presence of alcohol, police judged the case a straightforward suicide. After inspecting the scene, they found four more razor blades in their envelopes in a small package. Police interviews further revealed that no one had seen or heard anything suspicious. His death became controversial because his notes suggested he was in Martinsburg to meet a source about a story he called "the Octopus". This centered on a sprawling collaboration involving an international cabal. Casolaro's family argued that he had been murdered; that before he left for Martinsburg, he had apparently told his brother that he had been frequently receiving harassing phone calls late at night; that some of them were threatening; and that if something were to happen to him while in Martinsburg, it would not be an accident. They also cited his well-known squeamishness and fear of blood tests, and stated they found it incomprehensible that if he were going to commit suicide, he would do so by cutting his wrists a dozen times. Casolaro's case was featured on a March 10, 1993 episode of Unsolved Mysteries which examined links between him and the unsolved deaths of Charles Morgan and Doug Johnston that were both covered in a previous episode. However, Casolaro's case still remains unsolved.
 39-year-old Vali Delahanty disappeared on August 18, 1992. Prior to her disappearance, she lived with her boyfriend, John Munson, a long-time friend and confidant of suspected CIA contract officer Michael Riconosciuto. Vali wrote to Riconosciuto stating she had information that the DEA was working with John Munson to set Riconosciuto up on a false amphetamine-manufacturing charge. Delahanty's sister, Debbie Baker, had reported that Vali had called her shortly before her disappearance. Vali had told her that she was in possession of extremely sensitive information relating to Inslaw, as well as the DEA and Justice Department's attempt to falsely imprison Riconosciuto. She further told her that she was prepared to testify on these matters before a Grand Jury. Her skeletal remains were discovered in a ravine in Lake Bay, Washington in April of the following year. While no cause of death has been determined, the evidence at the scene was reported to suggest that Delahanty had been wading in a nearby creek, spread out her clothes to dry and had been sitting on a log when she died. Several months before her body was discovered, John Munson had, while under the influence of alcohol, reportedly told several people at a local bar that Vali was dead.
 On November 5, 1992, 45-year-old commodities broker Ian Stuart Spiro disappeared from his home. His wife, Gail Spiro, 41, his daughters, Sara Spiro, 16, and Dina Spiro, 11, as well as their son, Adam Spiro, 14, were found shot to death in their beds in their luxurious, rented home in the Covenant section of Rancho Santa Fe, California, north of San Diego. Each had been shot in the head execution-style with a large calibre handgun as they slept. For the ensuing three days, Spiro was the only suspect in the slaying. On the afternoon of the fourth day, Spiro was found dead behind the wheel of his Ford Explorer in a rocky canyon on the western edge of the Anza-Borego Desert. It was subsequently found that he died of cyanide poisoning and the case was officially declared a murder-suicide ostensibly sparked by pressure from the family's alleged financial problems. Ian Spiro was supposedly a Casolaro informant and was allegedly involved in the Inslaw affair. In 1995, a San Diego magazine reported that Spiro's brother-in-law Greg Quarton suspected that either the CIA or Mossad was involved in Spiro's death, while it was "confirmed to the media that Spiro was indeed involved in the release of hostages in the Middle East," referring to the October Surprise scandal. It was noted that: "According to court documents filed shortly after the murders, Spiro was holding computer equipment essential... to prove a Justice Department conspiracy to steal sophisticated computer software." Police stated that Spiro was a "low-level conduit by United States government intelligence agencies and the United Kingdom's MI6" from 1981 to 1986.

Later developments
A 1999 book by the British journalist Gordon Thomas, titled Gideon's Spies: The Secret History of the Mossad, repeated the claims of Ari Ben-Menashe that Israeli intelligence created and marketed a Trojan horse version of PROMISin order to spy on intelligence agencies in other countries.

In 2001, the Washington Times and Fox News each quoted federal law enforcement officials familiar with debriefing former FBI Agent Robert Hanssen as claiming that the convicted spy had stolen copies of a PROMIS-derivative for his Soviet KGB handlers. Later reports and studies of Hanssen's activities have not repeated these claims.

References

Further reading

 The Last Circle: Danny Casolaro's Investigation into the Octopus and the PROMIS Software Scandal by Cheri Seymour (Trine Day, September 26, 2010 )
 The Attorney General's refusal to provide congressional access to "privileged" INSLAW documents: hearing before the Subcommittee on Economic and Commercial Law of the Committee on the Judiciary, House of Representatives, One Hundred First Congress, second session, December 5, 1990. Washington : U.S. G.P.O. : For sale by the Supt. of Docs., Congressional Sales Office, U.S. G.P.O, 1990. Superintendent of Documents Number Y 4.J 89/1:101/114
 PROMIS : briefing series. Washington, D.C. : Institute for Law and Social Research, 1974-1977. "[A] series of 21 Briefing Papers for PROMIS (Prosecutor's Management Information System), this publication was prepared by the Institute for Law and Social Research (INSLAW), Washington, D.C., under a grant from the Law Enforcement Assistance Administration (LEAA), which has designated PROMIS as an Exemplary Project." OCLC Number 5882076

External links

 Inslaw related documents on the Internet Archive

United States contract case law
Copyright infringement of software
Political scandals in the United States
Companies that have filed for Chapter 7 bankruptcy
Companies that filed for Chapter 11 bankruptcy in 1985
Reagan administration controversies